Żarnowo may refer to the following places:
Żarnowo, Masovian Voivodeship (east-central Poland)
Żarnowo, Goleniów County in West Pomeranian Voivodeship (north-west Poland)
Żarnowo, Pyrzyce County in West Pomeranian Voivodeship (north-west Poland)
Żarnowo, Szczecinek County in West Pomeranian Voivodeship (north-west Poland)